Ukwa East is a Local Government Area located in Abia State, Nigeria. Its headquarters is in the town of Akwete. Ukwa East is bordered by Akwa Ibom State and Rivers States.

It has an area of 280 km and a population of 58,865 at the 2006 census. It has 10 political wards recognised by the Independent National Electoral Commission (INEC), a body that conducts national elections for Nigeria and 14 political wards recognised by the Abia State Independent Electoral Commission, a body that conducts elections for Abia State. Ukwa East shares Azumini border with Akwa Ibom State.

The postal code of the area is 452.

References

Local Government Areas in Abia State